The 1994–95 NBA season was the Magic's 6th season in the National Basketball Association. After building through the draft in previous years, the Magic made themselves even stronger by signing free agents Horace Grant, who won three championships with the Chicago Bulls, and Brian Shaw during the off-season. The Magic got off to a fast start winning 22 of their first 27 games, then later holding a 37–10 record at the All-Star break. Despite losing seven of their final eleven games in April, the Magic easily won the Atlantic Division with a 57–25 record. They also finished with a 39–2 home record, tied for second best in NBA history.

Shaquille O'Neal continued to dominate the NBA with 29.3 points, 11.4 rebounds and 2.4 blocks per game, and was named to the All-NBA Second Team, while second-year star Penny Hardaway averaged 20.9 points, 7.2 assists and 1.7 steals per game, while being named to the All-NBA First Team, and Grant gave the Magic one of the most dominant starting lineups in the NBA, averaging 12.8 points and 9.7 rebounds per game, as he was named to the NBA All-Defensive Second Team. In addition, Nick Anderson provided the team with 15.8 points and 1.6 steals per game, while three-point specialist Dennis Scott played a sixth man role, averaging 12.9 points per game off the bench, Donald Royal contributed 9.1 points and 4.0 rebounds per game as the team's starting small forward, and Shaw contributed 6.4 points and 5.2 assists per game off the bench. O'Neal and Hardaway were both selected to play in the 1995 NBA All-Star Game, with head coach Brian Hill coaching the Eastern Conference. O'Neal also finished in second place in Most Valuable Player voting, while Hardaway finished in tenth place, and Scott finished in fifth place in Sixth Man of the Year voting.

In the Eastern Conference First Round of the playoffs, the Magic overwhelmed the Boston Celtics with a 124–77 victory in Game 1. Despite losing Game 2 at home, 99–92, the Magic would eliminate the Celtics at the Boston Garden to win the series, 3–1. These matches would be the final 2 basketball games ever played at the Garden. Coincidentially, O’Neal played his final game in Boston 16 years later with the 2010–11 Boston Celtics before retiring from the NBA at 39 years old.

In the Eastern Conference Semi-finals, the Magic were matched up against the 5th-seeded Chicago Bulls. The Bulls were on an emotional high as Michael Jordan had just returned from his baseball career to play basketball. Jordan was now wearing the number 45 for the Bulls. The Magic won the first game 94–91. Tensions rose when Anderson indicated that Jordan was no longer the same player when Anderson was quoted by the media saying, "No. 45 doesn't explode like No. 23 used to. No. 23, he could just blow by you. He took off like a space shuttle. No. 45, he revs up, but he really doesn't take off." The comment motivated Jordan to return to number 23 and the Bulls evened the series with a 104–94 road win in Game 2. With the series tied at two games a piece, the Magic won Game 5 at home, 103–95. The Magic would eliminate the Bulls in Game 6 as the Magic won, 108–102 to advance to the Conference Finals.

In the Eastern Conference Finals, the Magic would beat Reggie Miller, and the 2nd-seeded and Central Division champion Indiana Pacers in a tough 7-game series that saw the home team win every game. The Magic were off to their first ever NBA Finals appearance.

In the Finals, the Magic faced off against the 6th-seeded and defending NBA champion Houston Rockets. Shaq would be up against Hakeem Olajuwon in a battle of All-Star Centers. Game 1 was played in Orlando and the game was lost at the free-throw line. Anderson missed four consecutive free throws with the Magic up by three at the waning seconds of the game and the Rockets tied the game at the buzzer. The Rockets would then win Game 1 in overtime, 120–118. The Magic would not recover from their Game 1 loss as the Rockets swept the series in four straight. Following the season, Anthony Avent was traded to the newly expansion Vancouver Grizzlies, and Tree Rollins retired.

For the season, the Magic added new blue pinstripe road uniforms, while the black pinstripe jerseys became their alternate. Both uniforms remained in use until 1998. Orlando did not make another appearance in the NBA Finals until 2009.

Draft picks

Roster

Regular season

Season standings

Record vs. opponents

Game log

Regular season

|- align="center" bgcolor="#ffcccc"
| 1
| November 4, 1994
| @ Washington
|- align="center" bgcolor="#ccffcc"
| 2
| November 5, 1994
| Philadelphia
|- align="center" bgcolor="#ccffcc"
| 3
| November 9, 1994
| @ Charlotte
|- align="center" bgcolor="#ffcccc"
| 4
| November 10, 1994
| @ New York
|- align="center" bgcolor="#ccffcc"
| 5
| November 12, 1994
| @ Philadelphia
|- align="center" bgcolor="#ccffcc"
| 6
| November 15, 1994
| Washington
|- align="center" bgcolor="#ccffcc"
| 7
| November 18, 1994
| New Jersey
|- align="center" bgcolor="#ccffcc"
| 8
| November 21, 1994
| Miami
|- align="center" bgcolor="#ccffcc"
| 9
| November 23, 19947:30p.m. EST
| Houston
| W 117–94
| O'Neal (30)
| Grant (12)
| Hardaway (7)
| Orlando Arena16,010
| 7–2
|- align="center" bgcolor="#ccffcc"
| 10
| November 25, 1994
| @ Boston
|- align="center" bgcolor="#ccffcc"
| 11
| November 26, 1994
| @ Milwaukee
|- align="center" bgcolor="#ccffcc"
| 12
| November 30, 1994
| Sacramento

|- align="center" bgcolor="#ccffcc"
| 13
| December 2, 1994
| New York
|- align="center" bgcolor="#ffcccc"
| 14
| December 3, 1994
| @ Atlanta
|- align="center" bgcolor="#ccffcc"
| 15
| December 6, 1994
| @ Cleveland
|- align="center" bgcolor="#ccffcc"
| 16
| December 7, 1994
| Cleveland
|- align="center" bgcolor="#ccffcc"
| 17
| December 9, 1994
| @ Miami
|- align="center" bgcolor="#ccffcc"
| 18
| December 10, 1994
| Atlanta
|- align="center" bgcolor="#ffcccc"
| 19
| December 12, 1994
| @ New Jersey
|- align="center" bgcolor="#ccffcc"
| 20
| December 14, 1994
| Denver
|- align="center" bgcolor="#ccffcc"
| 21
| December 16, 1994
| @ Golden State
|- align="center" bgcolor="#ffcccc"
| 22
| December 17, 1994
| @ Seattle
|- align="center" bgcolor="#ccffcc"
| 23
| December 20, 1994
| @ Portland
|- align="center" bgcolor="#ccffcc"
| 24
| December 21, 1994
| @ L.A. Clippers
|- align="center" bgcolor="#ccffcc"
| 25
| December 23, 1994
| Milwaukee
|- align="center" bgcolor="#ccffcc"
| 26
| December 26, 1994
| @ Washington
|- align="center" bgcolor="#ccffcc"
| 27
| December 27, 1994
| Miami
|- align="center" bgcolor="#ffcccc"
| 28
| December 29, 1994
| @ Charlotte
|- align="center" bgcolor="#ccffcc"
| 29
| December 30, 1994
| L.A. Clippers

|- align="center" bgcolor="#ccffcc"
| 30
| January 4, 1995
| New Jersey
|- align="center" bgcolor="#ccffcc"
| 31
| January 6, 1995
| Minnesota
|- align="center" bgcolor="#ccffcc"
| 32
| January 8, 1995
| @ Detroit
|- align="center" bgcolor="#ffcccc"
| 33
| January 10, 1995
| @ Chicago
|- align="center" bgcolor="#ccffcc"
| 34
| January 11, 1995
| Detroit
|- align="center" bgcolor="#ccffcc"
| 35
| January 13, 1995
| @ Atlanta
|- align="center" bgcolor="#ccffcc"
| 36
| January 14, 1995
| Philadelphia
|- align="center" bgcolor="#ccffcc"
| 37
| January 17, 1995
| Charlotte
|- align="center" bgcolor="#ccffcc"
| 38
| January 18, 1995
| @ Dallas
|- align="center" bgcolor="#ccffcc"
| 39
| January 20, 1995
| @ Denver
|- align="center" bgcolor="#ffcccc"
| 40
| January 22, 1995
| @ Phoenix
|- align="center" bgcolor="#ccffcc"
| 41
| January 24, 1995
| Boston
|- align="center" bgcolor="#ccffcc"
| 42
| January 26, 1995
| Chicago
|- align="center" bgcolor="#ccffcc"
| 43
| January 28, 1995
| Milwaukee

|- align="center" bgcolor="#ffcccc"
| 44
| February 2, 1995
| Seattle
|- align="center" bgcolor="#ffcccc"
| 45
| February 3, 19957:30p.m. EST
| @ Indiana
| L 106–118
| Scott (35)
| O'Neal (10)
| Hardaway (7)
| Market Square Arena16,749
| 35–10
|- align="center" bgcolor="#ccffcc"
| 46
| February 5, 1995
| New York
|- align="center" bgcolor="#ccffcc"
| 47
| February 7, 1995
| Dallas
|- align="center"
|colspan="9" bgcolor="#bbcaff"|All-Star Break
|- style="background:#cfc;"
|- bgcolor="#bbffbb"
|- align="center" bgcolor="#ccffcc"
| 48
| February 14, 19957:30p.m. EST
| Indiana
| W 111–92
| Scott (18)
| Grant (16)
| Hardaway (6)
| Orlando Arena16,010
| 38–10
|- align="center" bgcolor="#ffcccc"
| 49
| February 15, 1995
| @ Cleveland
|- align="center" bgcolor="#ccffcc"
| 50
| February 17, 1995
| Philadelphia
|- align="center" bgcolor="#ffcccc"
| 51
| February 19, 1995
| @ Minnesota
|- align="center" bgcolor="#ccffcc"
| 52
| February 20, 1995
| @ Milwaukee
|- align="center" bgcolor="#ffcccc"
| 53
| February 23, 1995
| @ Boston
|- align="center" bgcolor="#ccffcc"
| 54
| February 24, 1995
| Boston
|- align="center" bgcolor="#ccffcc"
| 55
| February 26, 1995
| Chicago
|- align="center" bgcolor="#ccffcc"
| 56
| February 28, 1995
| New York

|- align="center" bgcolor="#ccffcc"
| 57
| March 2, 19959:45p.m. EST
| @ Houston
| W 107–96
| Hardaway (30)
| O'Neal (20)
| Scott (7)
| The Summit16,611
| 44–13
|- align="center" bgcolor="#ffcccc"
| 58
| March 3, 19958:30p.m. EST
| @ San Antonio
| L 111–112
| O'Neal (36)
| O'Neal (12)
| Hardaway (7)
| Alamodome35,818
| 44–14
|- align="center" bgcolor="#ccffcc"
| 59
| March 5, 1995
| Atlanta
|- align="center" bgcolor="#ccffcc"
| 60
| March 8, 1995
| L.A. Lakers
|- align="center" bgcolor="#ccffcc"
| 61
| March 10, 1995
| Portland
|- align="center" bgcolor="#ccffcc"
| 62
| March 12, 199512 Noon EST
| San Antonio
| W 110–104
| Hardaway (31)
| O'Neal (13)
| Hardaway, Shaw (6)
| Orlando Arena16,010
| 48–14
|- align="center" bgcolor="#ffcccc"
| 63
| March 14, 1995
| Utah
|- align="center" bgcolor="#ffcccc"
| 64
| March 15, 1995
| @ New Jersey
|- align="center" bgcolor="#ffcccc"
| 65
| March 17, 19957:30p.m. EST
| @ Indiana
| L 97–107
| O'Neal (28)
| O'Neal (14)
| Hardaway (11)
| Market Square Arena16,706
| 48–17
|- align="center" bgcolor="#ccffcc"
| 66
| March 21, 1995
| Phoenix
|- align="center" bgcolor="#ccffcc"
| 67
| March 23, 1995
| Charlotte
|- align="center" bgcolor="#ccffcc"
| 68
| March 24, 1995
| @ Chicago
|- align="center" bgcolor="#ccffcc"
| 69
| March 26, 1995
| Golden State
|- align="center" bgcolor="#ffcccc"
| 70
| March 28, 1995
| @ Sacramento
|- align="center" bgcolor="#ccffcc"
| 71
| March 31, 1995
| @ Utah

|- align="center" bgcolor="#ffcccc"
| 72
| April 2, 1995
| @ L.A. Lakers
|- align="center" bgcolor="#ccffcc"
| 73
| April 5, 1995
| Detroit
|- align="center" bgcolor="#ffcccc"
| 74
| April 7, 1995
| @ Detroit
|- align="center" bgcolor="#ffcccc"
| 75
| April 8, 1995
| @ Philadelphia
|- align="center" bgcolor="#ccffcc"
| 76
| April 11, 1995
| Cleveland
|- align="center" bgcolor="#ffcccc"
| 77
| April 13, 1995
| @ Boston
|- align="center" bgcolor="#ffcccc"
| 78
| April 15, 1995
| @ Miami
|- align="center" bgcolor="#ccffcc"
| 79
| April 17, 1995
| Washington
|- align="center" bgcolor="#ffcccc"
| 80
| April 19, 1995
| @ Washington
|- align="center" bgcolor="#ccffcc"
| 81
| April 21, 19958:00p.m. EDT
| Indiana
| W 110–86
| Grant, O'Neal (20)
| O'Neal (13)
| Anderson (7)
| Orlando Arena16,010
| 57–24
|- align="center" bgcolor="#ffcccc"
| 82
| April 23, 1995
| @ New York

Playoffs

|- align="center" bgcolor="#ccffcc"
| 1
| April 28, 1995
| Boston
| W 124–77
| Shaquille O'Neal (23)
| Horace Grant (14)
| Penny Hardaway (5)
| Orlando Arena16,010
| 1–0
|- align="center" bgcolor="#ffcccc"
| 2
| April 30, 1995
| Boston
| L 92–99
| Penny Hardaway (26)
| Horace Grant (14)
| Penny Hardaway (8)
| Orlando Arena16,010
| 1–1
|- align="center" bgcolor="#ccffcc"
| 3
| May 3, 1995
| @ Boston
| W 82–77
| Nick Anderson (24)
| Shaquille O'Neal (21)
| Penny Hardaway (8)
| Boston Garden14,890
| 2–1
|- align="center" bgcolor="#ccffcc"
| 4
| May 5, 1995
| @ Boston
| W 95–92
| Shaquille O'Neal (25)
| Shaquille O'Neal (13)
| Penny Hardaway (13)
| Boston Garden14,890
| 3–1
|-

|- align="center" bgcolor="#ccffcc"
| 1
| May 7, 1995
| Chicago
| W 94–91
| Shaquille O'Neal (26)
| Shaquille O'Neal (12)
| Hardaway, Shaw (6)
| Orlando Arena16,010
| 1–0
|- align="center" bgcolor="#ffcccc"
| 2
| May 10, 1995
| Chicago
| L 94–104
| Shaquille O'Neal (25)
| Horace Grant (15)
| Penny Hardaway (7)
| Orlando Arena16,010
| 1–1
|- align="center" bgcolor="#ccffcc"
| 3
| May 12, 1995
| @ Chicago
| W 110–101
| Shaquille O'Neal (28)
| Horace Grant (14)
| Penny Hardaway (8)
| United Center24,281
| 2–1
|- align="center" bgcolor="#ffcccc"
| 4
| May 14, 1995
| @ Chicago
| L 95–106
| Horace Grant (21)
| Horace Grant (13)
| Shaquille O'Neal (9)
| United Center24,358
| 2–2
|- align="center" bgcolor="#ccffcc"
| 5
| May 16, 1995
| Chicago
| W 103–95
| Horace Grant (24)
| Shaquille O'Neal (22)
| Penny Hardaway (11)
| Orlando Arena16,010
| 3–2
|- align="center" bgcolor="#ccffcc"
| 6
| May 18, 1995
| @ Chicago
| W 108–102
| Shaquille O'Neal (27)
| Shaquille O'Neal (13)
| Penny Hardaway (7)
| United Center24,322
| 4–2
|-

|- align="center" bgcolor="#ccffcc"
| 1
| May 23, 19958:00p.m. EDT
| Indiana
| W 105–101
| O'Neal (32)
| Grant (12)
| Hardaway (14)
| Orlando Arena16,010
| 1–0
|- align="center" bgcolor="#ccffcc"
| 2
| May 25, 19958:00p.m. EDT
| Indiana
| W 119–114
| O'Neal (39)
| Grant (12)
| Hardaway (15)
| Orlando Arena16,010
| 2–0
|- align="center" bgcolor="#ffcccc"
| 3
| May 27, 19953:30p.m. EDT
| @ Indiana
| L 100–105
| Hardaway (29)
| Turner (7)
| Grant, Hardaway, O'Neal (4)
| Market Square Arena16,477
| 2–1
|- align="center" bgcolor="#ffcccc"
| 4
| May 29, 19953:30p.m. EDT
| @ Indiana
| L 93–94
| Hardaway (26)
| Grant (12)
| Shaw (5)
| Market Square Arena16,477
| 2–2
|- align="center" bgcolor="#ccffcc"
| 5
| May 31, 19959:00p.m. EDT
| Indiana
| W 108–106
| O'Neal (35)
| O'Neal (13)
| Hardaway (8)
| Orlando Arena16,010
| 3–2
|- align="center" bgcolor="#ffcccc"
| 6
| June 2, 19959:00p.m. EDT
| @ Indiana
| L 96–123
| O'Neal (26)
| Grant (9)
| Anderson (5)
| Market Square Arena16,477
| 3–3
|- align="center" bgcolor="#ccffcc"
| 7
| June 4, 19957:00p.m. EDT
| Indiana
| W 105–81
| O'Neal (25)
| O'Neal (11)
| Anderson (7)
| Orlando Arena16,010
| 4–3
|-

|- align="center" bgcolor="#ffcccc"
| 1
| June 7, 19959:00p.m. EDT
| Houston
| L 118–120 (OT)
| Hardaway, O'Neal (26)
| Grant, O'Neal (16)
| O'Neal (9)
| Orlando Arena16,010
| 0–1
|- align="center" bgcolor="#ffcccc"
| 2
| June 9, 19959:00p.m. EDT
| Houston
| L 106–117
| O'Neal (33)
| O'Neal (12)
| Hardaway (8)
| Orlando Arena16,010
| 0–2
|- align="center" bgcolor="#ffcccc"
| 3
| June 11, 19957:30p.m. EDT
| @ Houston
| L 103–106
| O'Neal (28)
| Anderson, Grant, O'Neal (10)
| Hardaway (14)
| The Summit16,611
| 0–3
|- align="center" bgcolor="#ffcccc"
| 4
| June 14, 19959:00p.m. EDT
| @ Houston
| L 101–113
| Hardaway, O'Neal (25)
| Grant, O'Neal (12)
| Hardaway (5)
| The Summit16,611
| 0–4
|-

Player statistics

Season

Playoffs

Awards and honors
 Shaquille O'Neal – All-NBA 2nd team, Scoring Champion, All-Star
 Penny Hardaway – All-NBA 1st Team, All-Star
 Horace Grant – All-Defensive 2nd Team
 Brian Hill – All-Star East Head Coach

Transactions

Trades

Free agents

Player Transactions Citation:

References

 Orlando Magic on Database Basketball
 Orlando Magic on Basketball Reference

Orlando Magic seasons
Eastern Conference (NBA) championship seasons
1994 in sports in Florida
1995 in sports in Florida